Rondotia lineata is a moth in the family Bombycidae. It was described by John Henry Leech in 1898. It is found in China and Korea.

References

Bombycidae
Moths described in 1898